The women's featherweight (−59 kilograms) event at the 2002 Asian Games took place on Sunday 13 October 2002 at Gudeok Gymnasium, Busan, South Korea.

A total of ten competitors from ten different countries (NOCs) competed in this event, limited to fighters whose body weight was less than 59 kilograms. 

Yun Sung-hee of South Korea won the gold medal after beating Tseng Pei-hua of Chinese Taipei in gold medal match 4–1, The bronze medal was shared by Chinese Wang Shuo and Vietnamese Lê Thị Nhung. Athletes from Iran, Bhutan, India and Kazakhstan lost in quarterfinal and they all finished fifth.

The silver medalist Tseng Pei-hua later changed her name to Tseng Li-cheng.

Schedule
All times are Korea Standard Time (UTC+09:00)

Results

References
2002 Asian Games Official Report, Page 729

External links
Official website

Taekwondo at the 2002 Asian Games